Baildon may refer to:

Andrew Baildon (born 1971), Australian former freestyle and butterfly Olympic swimmer
Baildon, civil parish and town in West Yorkshire, Northern England
Baildon railway station serving the town of Baildon near Shipley in West Yorkshire, England
George Baildon (1868–1946), New Zealand businessman and Mayor of Auckland City
Henry Bellyse Baildon (1849–1907), 19th century Scottish scholar and poet
John Baildon (1772–1846), Scottish pioneer in metallurgy in continental Europe
Baildon Katowice, ice hockey team from Katowice, Poland
Rural Municipality of Baildon No. 131, rural municipality in the Canadian province of Saskatchewan
Baildon, Saskatchewan, unincorporated community in Baildon Rural Municipality No. 131, Saskatchewan, Canada
Baildon Steelworks, a major steelworks in Katowice, Poland

See also
Badon (disambiguation)
Bailon
Basildon
Basilodon
Brasilodon

es:Baildon
fr:Baildon
it:Baildon
nl:Baildon